Farhad Valiyev (born 1 November 1980) is a retired Azerbaijani football goalkeeper.

Career

Club
On 3 June 2016, after 10-years with Qarabağ FK, Valiyev signed a one-year contract with Sumgayit FK.

Valiyev retired in the summer 2019.

International
Valiyev has made 32 appearances for the Azerbaijan national football team.

Career statistics

Club

International

Statistics accurate as of match played 3 March 2010

Honours
Neftchi Baku
Azerbaijan Premier League (1): 2003–04
Azerbaijan Cup (2): 2001–02, 2003–04

Qarabağ
Azerbaijan Premier League (3): 2013–14, 2014–15, 2015–16 
Azerbaijan Cup (3): 2008–09, 2014–15, 2015–16

References

1980 births
Living people
People from Quba
Azerbaijani footballers
Azerbaijan international footballers
Shamakhi FK players
Qarabağ FK players
Azerbaijan Premier League players
Association football goalkeepers
Neftçi PFK players
Sumgayit FK players
FK Genclerbirliyi Sumqayit players